He Can Do the Impossible, released in 1994 on CGI Records, is a gospel music album by American contemporary gospel music group Witness. The album reached No. 12 on the Billboard Gospel Albums chart.

Track listing
"He Can Do the Impossible"
"We Give Thanks"
"Just as You Are"
"More Than the World Against You"
"Where Would I Be"
"When I Pray"
"You'll Never Walk Alone"
"It's Your Time"
"After the Storm Is Gone"
"It's Raining in My Life Again"

Personnel
Lisa Page Brooks: Vocals
Laeh Page: Vocals
Diane Campbell: Vocals
Lou Ann Stewart: Vocals

Charts

References

1994 albums
Witness (gospel group) albums